Saku Mäenalanen (born 29 May 1994) is a Finnish professional ice hockey forward for the Winnipeg Jets of the National Hockey League (NHL). Mäenalanen was selected by the Nashville Predators in the fifth round (125th overall) of the 2013 NHL Entry Draft.

Playing career
Mäenalanen played junior hockey within the Oulun Kärpät organization. Following his selection in the NHL draft by the Predators, he made his professional debut in the Liiga with Oulun Kärpät during the 2013–14 season.

Unsigned by the Nashville Predators, Mäenalanen continued in the Liiga with Oulun Kärpät, also enduring a shortened loan stint with fellow Liiga club, Lahti Pelicans in the 2014–15 season.

In the 2017–18 season, Mäenalanen enjoyed a breakout season totaling 17 goals and 46 points in 59 games, ranking 11th among scorers in Liiga. He added 10 points postseason, helping Oulun capture the league championship. On 18 May 2018, Mäenalanen gained NHL interest and signed a one-year, two-way contract with the Carolina Hurricanes. In signing with the Hurricanes, he was reunited with former Finnish junior teammate, Sebastian Aho.

Mäenalanen began the 2018–19 season with the Hurricanes American Hockey League affiliate, the Charlotte Checkers. He was recalled to the NHL on 6 December after playing in 23 games and recording 11 points for the Checkers. He made his NHL debut the following day in a 4–1 win over the Anaheim Ducks. He recorded his first NHL goal on 8 January in a 4–3 win over the New York Islanders.

As a restricted free agent after his first North American season, Mäenalanen could not agree to terms with the Hurricanes on a new contract. With his rights still held by the Hurricanes, Mäenalanen opted to return to his native Finland to resume his career in the KHL. He agreed to an optional two-year contract with Jokerit on 25 September 2019.

After two seasons with Jokerit, Mäenalanen returned to his original Finnish club, Oulun Kärpät of the Liiga, agreeing to a three-year contract on 11 June 2021. In his first season back with Kärpät in 2021–22, Mäenalanen led the team in scoring with 13 goals and 28 assists for 41 points in 47 games.

On 19 July 2022, Mäenalanen enacted an NHL opt-out clause in the off-season by signing a one-year, two-way contract with the Winnipeg Jets.

International play

Maenalanen made his senior debut for Finland at the 2018 IIHF World Championship. In a fifth-place finish, he posted two goals and three assists in 8 contests.

Career statistics

Regular season and playoffs

International

Awards and honours

References

External links
 

1994 births
Living people
Carolina Hurricanes players
Charlotte Checkers (2010–) players
Finnish ice hockey right wingers
Hokki players
Jokerit players
Jokipojat players
Lahti Pelicans players
Nashville Predators draft picks
Oulun Kärpät players
People from Tornio
Ice hockey players at the 2022 Winter Olympics
Olympic ice hockey players of Finland
Medalists at the 2022 Winter Olympics
Olympic gold medalists for Finland
Olympic medalists in ice hockey
Sportspeople from Lapland (Finland)
Winnipeg Jets players